Naucelle is a railway station in Naucelle, Occitanie, France. The station is on the Castelnaudary–Rodez railway line. The station is served by TER (local) services operated by SNCF.

Train services
The following services currently call at Naucelle:
local service (TER Occitanie) Toulouse–Albi–Rodez

References

Railway stations in Aveyron